Events in the year 1834 in Norway.

Incumbents
Monarch: Charles III John

Events

Arts and literature

Births
14 June – Emil Stang, jurist, politician and Prime Minister of Norway (d.1912)

Full date unknown
Markus Nomil Iversen, ship-owner and politician
Ole Anton Qvam, politician and Minister (d.1904)

Deaths
 20 September Johan Peter Strömberg, actor, dancer and theatre director, founder of the first public theatre of Norway (born 1773).

Full date unknown
Jens Aars, priest and politician (b.1780)

See also